Morris Township is one of seventeen townships in Grundy County, Illinois, USA.  As of the 2010 United States Census, its population was 7,110 and it contained 3,299 housing units.

Geography

Cities, towns, villages
 Morris (east quarter)

Cemeteries
The township contains Evergreen Cemetery.

Major highways
  Illinois Route 47

Airports and landing strips
 Morris Hospital Heliport

Landmarks
 Gebhard Woods State Park
 Goold Park
 Grundy County Courthouse & Govt Center
 William G. Stratton State Park

Demographics

Political districts
 Illinois' 11th congressional district
 State House District 75
 State Senate District 38

References
 
 United States Census Bureau 2007 TIGER/Line Shapefiles
 United States National Atlas

External links
 City-Data.com
 Illinois State Archives

Townships in Grundy County, Illinois
Townships in Illinois
1849 establishments in Illinois